Polycarpon polycarpoides is a species of flowering plant in the manyseed genus Polycarpon, family Caryophyllaceae, native to the western Mediterranean; Morocco, Algeria, Tunisia, Spain, the Balearic Islands, France, Italy, and Sicily. It is a member of the Polycarpon tetraphyllum species aggregate.

Subtaxa
The following subspecies are accepted:
Polycarpon polycarpoides subsp. catalaunicum O.Bolòs & Vigo – Spain, Algeria, Tunisia
Polycarpon polycarpoides subsp. colomense (Porta) Pedrol – Balearic Islands
Polycarpon polycarpoides subsp. polycarpoides

References

Caryophyllaceae
Flora of Algeria
Flora of the Balearic Islands
Flora of France
Flora of Italy
Flora of Morocco
Flora of Sicily
Flora of Spain
Flora of Tunisia
Plants described in 1908